Calceolaria lavandulifolia is a species of plant in the Calceolariaceae family. It is endemic to Ecuador.

References

lavandulifolia
Endemic flora of Ecuador
Endangered plants
Taxonomy articles created by Polbot